Minnesota State Highway 223 (MN 223) is a  highway in northwest Minnesota, which runs from its intersection with State Highway 92 in Holst Township of Clearwater County and continues east to its eastern terminus at its intersection with Clearwater County State-Aid Highway 10 in Leonard. It is also signed as Leonard Road.

MN 223 passes through Holst Township, Dudley Township, and Leonard.

Route description
Highway 223 serves as an east–west connector route in northwest Minnesota. It connects State Highway 92 with the town of Leonard.

The route is legally defined as Route 223 in the Minnesota Statutes.

History
Highway 223 was authorized on July 1, 1949.

The route was paved in 1960.

Major intersections

References

External links

Highway 223 at the Unofficial Minnesota Highways Page

223
Transportation in Clearwater County, Minnesota